Paragolsinda is a genus of longhorn beetles of the subfamily Lamiinae, containing the following species:

 Paragolsinda fruhstorferi Breuning, 1956
 Paragolsinda obscura (Matsushita, 1933)
 Paragolsinda siamensis Yamasako & Ohbayashi, 2011
 Paragolsinda tonkinensis (Breuning, 1938)

References

Mesosini